Red hall or Red Hall may refer to:

 Legislative Council of Quebec's former convening chamber
 Red Basilica, also known as the 'Red Hall', a temple to Serapis in Pergamon
 a metonym for the Rugby Football League
 Red Hall (Rdeča dvorana), sports facility in Velenje, Slovenia
 Red Hall, an area in Darlington

See also
 The Red Room (disambiguation)
 Red chamber (disambiguation)

Architectural disambiguation pages